Sitno  ( is a village in the administrative district of Gmina Szczecinek, within Szczecinek County, West Pomeranian Voivodeship, in north-western Poland.

For the history of the region, see History of Pomerania.

Notable residents
Karl Albrecht Schachtschneider (born 1940)

References

Villages in Szczecinek County